Hujra Shah Muqeem , is a city in Depalpur Tehsil of Okara District in the Punjab province of Pakistan. Qila Sondha Singh is the largest town in the city. It is near Depalpur, and is administratively subdivided into 3 Union Councils. The village is the site of a Sufi shrine and an historic gurudwara.

Famous persons

Preachers
Muslim saints who have come to preach in this area include:

Bahawal Sher Qalander, born Syed Bahauddin Gilani (see below)
Sayed Shah Noor Muhammad
Shah Muhammad Muqeem

Bahawal Sher Qalander
Born Syed Bahauddin Gilani, but popularly known as Bahawal Sher Qalander. He emigrated from Gilan, Iraq to the Indian subcontinent with his father Syed Mehmood and his paternal aunt. Qalander preached the message of the Qadri order for more than a decade, and lived longest among the Qadiriyya saints. According to Mufti Ghulam Sarwar, he lived for 240 years, dying on 18 Shawwal, AH 973 (1566 AD). He is buried in Hujra Shah Muqeem.

His father died in Budaun, Uttar Pradesh, India. His four sons Syed Ialal Ud Din Gillani (Masoom Pak), Shah Noor Muhammad, Shah Muhammad, and Shah Khalil Muhammad are buried in Hujra Shah Muqeem. The city is named after his grandson, Syed Muhkimuddin Shah Muqeem.

Transport and facilities
Transport services are provided to people via local buses and vans operating from the local bus station to nearby cities (Okara, Depalpur). Private taxis also operate in the city. Transport to adjoining villages and settlements is provided by rickshaws which operate from the stands, from Hujra Mor to Town Center & Jhujh Khurd Rikshaw Stop to Shamsabad & Dhuliana.

There are separate government-run high schools for boys and girls in the city. The city is home to a government degree college for women, in addition to numerous private institutions

Health care services are provided by government-run hospitals and basic health care units.

References

Okara District